"Men in Black" is a song by American rapper and actor Will Smith from the 1997 film Men in Black, in which he also starred. The song was released by Columbia Records on June 3, 1997, as the lead single from both the Men in Black soundtrack and Smith's debut solo album, Big Willie Style (1997), and it was Smith's first solo single following his work with DJ Jazzy Jeff.

The song plays during the movie's closing credits and samples "Forget Me Nots" by Patrice Rushen. It features Smith rapping about how the Men in Black "Walk in shadow, move in silence" and play the role of "first, last and only line of defense, against the worst scum of the universe", while SWV singer Coko sings the chorus and background vocals. "Men in Black" reached number one in several countries and won Smith a Grammy Award in 1998 for the Best Rap Solo Performance.

Release and success
"Men in Black" features a sample of, and a re-sung chorus from, "Forget Me Nots" by Patrice Rushen. In a twist, the line "To help you to remember" is changed to "They won't let you remember", in reference to the memory-erasing "neuralyzer" devices used in the Men in Black movie.

Aside from appearing on the movie's soundtrack, "Men in Black" also appears on Smith's Columbia Records album Big Willie Style. "Men in Black" topped the charts in Australia, Belgium, France, Germany, Hungary, Ireland, New Zealand, Switzerland, and the United Kingdom. In Australia, Ireland, and the United Kingdom, "Men in Black" became Smith's second chart-topping song after "Boom! Shake the Room" in 1993, Smith's first solo chart-topping song, and Smith's first chart-topping song released under his real name. "Men in Black" did not chart on the Billboard Hot 100 because it was not released as a commercial single in the United States; at the time, only songs that were commercially released as singles were eligible, but it did top the airplay chart. The music video for the song also appears on the DVD The Will Smith Collection. It was also included in the album All Time Greatest Movie Songs, released by Sony in 1999. It was also featured after the end credits of the VHS release of "Men in Black".  It was also covered by Forever the Sickest Kids for the compilation album Punk Goes Crunk & by Alvin and the Chipmunks for the album The A-Files: Alien Songs. An instrumental and short version of the song plays over the closing credits in Men in Black: The Series.

Critical reception
Larry Flick from Billboard wrote, "Remember when Will Smith was better known as a rapper? That seems like a lifetime ago, doesn't it? Well, he returns to music in excellent form on this lighthearted theme song from the soundtrack to his new movie of the same name. Smith has never been a hardcore lyricist, but he also never been anything less than clever, charming, and shrewdly aware of what the masses will dig. There's no doubt that this jam, which nicks its hook from Patrice Rushen's "Forget Me Nots", will be an outta-da-box smasheroo." Pan-European magazine Music & Media said that Smith builds his raps on the song by Rushen "in an instantly appealing way." A reviewer from Music Week rated the song three out of five, noting that "Smith raps some rather stodgy sci-fi stuff over Patrice Rushen's Forget Me Nots riff. It will be huge, like the film. And the video is a hoot."

Music video
Robert Caruso directed the music video for the song. It starts with a dark hallway lighting up. Tommy Lee Jones enters from around the corner and begins to explain in a voiceover the purpose of the Men in Black. Will Smith enters with the line: "And we dress in black." There is then a cut to what appears to be an alleyway, a steel box which looks a bit like a commercial refrigerator in the middle. The surface begins to deform and show a glowing light from within. The video then cuts to several scenes of Agents experimenting on alien organisms and technology, with Smith rapping into further detail of the operations of the Men in Black. It soon has him surrounded by MIB agents in a warehouse. In the middle of the dance routine, an alien (Mikey from the film) comes in and screams at Smith. Smith then leads the agents and the alien to do a modified Electric Slide, where the alien slips out in the middle.

After dancing along with the agents, he goes after the alien. The same glowing light from the beginning of the video is then seen in the drivers seat of an SUV with the two female Agents who were with Smith in the vehicle; they speed off just as Smith reaches it. Disappointed, he puts on his sunglasses and takes out a Neuralyzer, pointing it at the camera.

Two versions of the video were made alternating the flash. In one version of the video, the flash takes the viewer back to the empty hallway from the opening scene, effectively erasing the video's contents entirely as if ensuring the viewer doesn't remember what they saw in the video, while in the other, the flash produces a white screen. Just before the flash in both, Smith says, somewhat regretfully, "Sorry".

Track listings

Australia
 CD single
 "Men in Black" — 3:48
 "Men in Black" (Track Masters instrumental) — 3:48
 "Men in Black" (Track Masters a cappella) — 3:29
 "Some Cow Fonque (More Tea, Vicar?)" (by Buckshot LeFonque) — 5:10

Europe
 CD single
 "Men in Black" (album version) — 3:48
 "Men in Black" (MIB master mix) — 3:40

 Maxi-CD single
 "Men in Black" (album version) — 3:48
 "Men in Black" (MIB master mix) — 3:40
 "Men in Black" (Track Masters instrumental) — 3:48
 This format was also released in South Africa.

UK
 CD1
 "Men in Black" (album version)
 "Men in Black" (instrumental)
 "M.I.B. Main Theme"
 "Men in Black" (the snippets)

 CD2
 "Men in Black" (album version)
 "Men in Black" (MIB master mix)
 "Men in Black" (alternate mix)
 "Dah Dee Dah (Sexy Thing)" (by Alicia Keys)

Japan
 Maxi-CD single
 "Men in Black" (album version) — 3:48
 "Men in Black" (Track Masters instrumental) — 3:48
 "Men in Black" (Track Masters a cappella) — 3:29
 "Men in Black" (MIB master mix) — 3:40

Personnel
 Patrice Rushen, Terry McFadden, Will Smith – writers, composers
 Coko – backing vocals
 Matthew Wishart – clarinet, trombone
 Poke and Tone – drum programming, producer
 Commissioner Gordon, Tony Maserati – mixing
 John Shriver – recording
 Paul Griffin – animation director for "Mikey" (video)
 Rob Chiarelli - recording engineer & remixer

Charts

Weekly charts

Year-end charts

Certifications

Release history

References

External links
 

Will Smith songs
1997 songs
1997 debut singles
Columbia Records singles
European Hot 100 Singles number-one singles
Film theme songs
Grammy Award for Best Rap Solo Performance
Irish Singles Chart number-one singles
Number-one singles in Australia
Number-one singles in Germany
Number-one singles in Hungary
Number-one singles in New Zealand
Number-one singles in Scotland
Number-one singles in Switzerland
Songs about outer space
SNEP Top Singles number-one singles
Song recordings produced by Trackmasters
Songs about extraterrestrial life
Songs from Men in Black (franchise)
Songs written by Will Smith
Songs written for films
UK Singles Chart number-one singles
Ultratop 50 Singles (Flanders) number-one singles